Henry Ringling North (November 12, 1909 – October 2, 1993) was an American businessman, as a circus proprietor who was the vice president, treasurer, director and operations chief, while his brother, John Ringling North, was the president and chairman of the Ringling Bros. and Barnum & Bailey Circus, founded by their uncles.

Biography
He was born in Chicago and attended Yale University. North was awarded a Silver Star for his actions in the Navy during World War II where he served in the Office of Strategic Services. In the 1960s he became an Irish citizen. He was involved with two oil firms in Oklahoma. His first two marriages ended in divorce. He died on October 2, 1993 in Begnins near Geneva, Switzerland.

Legacy
His son, John Ringling North III, is the former owner of the Kelly-Miller Circus.

References

External links

1909 births
1993 deaths
Businesspeople from Chicago
Military personnel from Illinois
Yale University alumni
Ringling Bros. and Barnum & Bailey Circus people
Circus owners
People of the Office of Strategic Services
Recipients of the Silver Star
20th-century American businesspeople
Naturalised citizens of Ireland